The Nala Danavi Wind Farm (also known as the Erumbukkudal Wind Farm after its location) is a  onshore wind farm in Erumbukkudal, on the Kalpitiya Peninsula, Sri Lanka. The facility consists of six wind turbines measuring  each.

See also 

 Electricity in Sri Lanka
 Pawan Danavi Wind Farm

References

External links 
 

Wind farms in Sri Lanka
Buildings and structures in Puttalam District